103rd is a proposed rapid transit station for the Red Line as part of the Red Line Extension. The station is planned to open in 2029 if the CTA can get the funding for the $3.6 billion project. The station would be constructed adjacent to the Union Pacific Railroad in Chicago's Roseland and Washington Heights neighborhoods.

References

External links
Red Ahead
Red Line Extension
Red Line Extension UPRR LPA

CTA Red Line stations
Railway stations scheduled to open in 2029
Proposed Chicago "L" stations